Phoenix International Academy (PIA) is a co-educational international school based in Mysore, Karnataka, which is affiliated with the Edexcel Board. They use concept-based teaching methodologies and a unique curriculum called The Pomegranate Program (Pre-K to UKG). They offer Edexcel curriculum from lower primary to International Advanced Levels (G12).

Curriculum 
Phoenix International Academy offers the Edexcel IGCSE program for 9th and 10th. Edexcel International GCSE qualifications are currently available in several subjects. On successful completion of these qualifications, students can choose to further their study by taking AS and A Levels (11th & 12th grade).

Sports and extra curricular activities 
Phoenix International Academy's fitness program, KIDZFIT, is tailor-made for each child's individual physical ability. Nutrition is also a big part of the fitness plan. Students go through a physical training regimen every day. Students take part in various inter-school sports competitions throughout the year including TAISI (The Association of International Schools in India), and the Annual Dasara Sports Meet.

The school offers various extra curricular programs, such as Music, Art, Kickboxing, Grow Green club (G4 Club), Helping Hand Group, Ethics for Future Responsible Citizens, Best out of waste and more.

Competitions and events 
PIA conducts several competitions and hosts a number of events throughout the academic year. Competitions such as Cooking, Elocution, Handwriting, and the Dell Quiz all take part annually within the school campus. PIA hosted a "Mom & Me" drawing competition, with a "Nada Habba" theme, during Dasara, which was open to the public.

In 2017, Phoenix International Academy became the first school in Mysore to host the Bonjour India French Festival, which consisted of various inter-school competitions, and Indo-French cuisine.

References 
http://myphoenixacademy.com/

Schools in Mysore